Albert Hensel (March 20, 1895 – June 5, 1942) was a German Communist executed under the Nazis. He was a member of the Communist Party of Germany and along with numerous other resistance fighters was executed by the Nazis.  Hensel  was born in Dresden where he and fellow communist members began their work against the Nazi regime.

Communism and the Reichstag Fire
Hitler became agitated by the Communist Party of Germany (KPD) after the Reichstag fire on February 23, 1933.  The fire was started by Marinus van der Lubbe who was accused of being one of many communist agitators; however, a trial in March 1933 determined van der Lubbe acted alone.  The Reichstag fire caused Hitler to create the Enabling Act which removed habeas corpus and many other civil liberties, providing Hitler with dictatorial control over Germany.  Hitler quickly established a plan to execute any person who was working against the Nazi party and twice extended the act beyond its initial 1937 expiration. The Enabling Act also allowed Hitler to rule that all competing political parties of the Nazi regime were illegal.  Albert Hensel and his co-conspirators did not have the strength to outwardly fight against Hitler, so they took a secretive approach to resisting.  The German police were secretive in their counter efforts as well.  The resisters were often not well received by the German populace and had to also hide their actions from them in fear of the citizens informing the police of their actions.

The Resistance
Most of the resistance’s actions involved industrial sabotage or publications that spoke of overthrowing Hitler and his government while promoting an anti-capitalist state.  The KPD published a booklet in 1934 titled, “We are Fighting for a Soviet Germany”.  That publication and the regular printing of a KPD newspaper, reasoned that the elimination of capitalism would erase religions and the hatred of religions including anti-Semitism.

Hensel would also join the Red Front or Rotfrontkämpferbund (RFB, other variants: Der Rote Frontkämpferbund, Roter Frontkämpferbund) (English: Red Front Fighters' League, Red Front Fighters Association) a paramilitary organization of the Communist Party of Germany, created on July 18, 1924, in Germany of the Weimar Republic period. Its first leader was Ernst Thälmann. The Red Front was banned in 1932.

The Dresden activists represented a small minority of the KPD included, Wilhelm Firl (journalist), Otto Gale (cobbler), Franz Hoffman, Kurt Schlosser, and Herbert Blcohwitz (carpenters), Arno Lade (team conductor), Franz Latzel (metal worker), Hans Rothbarth (textile worker), and Hans Daukner (Jewish Gardner).

Members of the Resistance
The KPD members were predominantly made up of the unemployed.  Many of its members relied on the group for food, clothing, and housing which may have caused some to become members.  The organization promised to pay its members for battling the German Nazis but likely were unable to provide any financial support. The KPD gained significant political power in Germany through the support of Hensel and its other members.  At its height in 1933, the KPD held 1/6 of the seats in the German congress. Hensel helped establish the Communist Party of Germany along with Karl Stein, Fritz Shulze and his wife Eva Schulze Knabe, Arno Lade, and Hans Rothbarth were residents of Dresden and all were opponents of the Nazis.  Many of them were convicted of treason by the Volksgerichtshof and eventually executed.

Plotzensee Prison
Hensel was one of over 2500 executions that took place at Plotzensee Prison.  Hensel was arrested on February 6, 1941, and remained in custody at Plotzensee for over fourteen months.  He was executed on June 5, 1942, at Plotzensee Prison in Berlin after being tried and convicted by the Volksgerichtshof.  Hensel was executed by either hanging or beheading on June 5, 1942. The cottage where the executions took place is still standing.

Plotzensee is still operating in Germany.  After World War II, the prison was used to house juvenile delinquents until 1987 when the juveniles were housed in a newly built facility nearby.  After the juveniles were moved, the prison has been used as a men’s prison which still remains in operation.

References
 Divided memory : the Nazi past in the two Germanys; Herf, Jeffrey. Harvard University Press, 1997. 
 Dresden:  A City Reborn; Clayton, Anthony and Russell, Alan, Berg Publishing, 2001.
 The Flame of Freedom: The German Struggle Against Hitler (Der Widerstand, Dissent and Resistance in the Third Reich); Zeller, Eberhard, Heller, R.P., Masters, D.R., Westview Press, 1994.  
 The German Communists and the Rise of Nazism; Conan Fischer.  Palgrave-Macmillan, 1991.

1895 births
Executed communists in the German Resistance
1942 deaths
People from Saxony executed at Plötzensee Prison
Politicians from Dresden